Mount Pénaud is a mountain rising to ca. 1050 m in the east part of Chavdar Peninsula, Danco Coast on the west side of Graham Land, Antarctica, 8.55 km east-southeast of Cape Herschel.  It surmounts Tumba Ice Cap to the northwest and Samodiva Glacier to the northeast.

The peak was roughly charted by Captain Henry Foster in January 1829 and called 'Mount Herschel' after Sir J. F. W. Herschel.  The mountain was photographed from the air by FIDASE, 1956–57 and, in association with the names of pioneers of aviation grouped in this area, named by the UK Antarctic Place-Names Committee Mount Pénaud after Alphonse Pénaud (1850–80), French aircraft designer, 1871–80.

Maps
 Antarctic Digital Database (ADD). Scale 1:250000 topographic map of Antarctica. Scientific Committee on Antarctic Research (SCAR). Since 1993, regularly upgraded and updated.

References
 Mount Pénaud. SCAR Composite Gazetteer of Antarctica

Mountains of Graham Land
Danco Coast